Miss International 2012, the 52nd Miss International pageant, was held on October 21, 2012 at Okinawa Prefectural Budokan Arena Building in Okinawa, Japan. Fernanda Cornejo from Ecuador crowned her successor Ikumi Yoshimatsu from Japan at the end of the event.

Yoshimatsu was dethroned shortly before the end of her reign, but she was not replaced. She was ordered by The International Culture Association (Miss International organizer) to skip the succession ceremony and “play sick and shut up” out of fear of scandal.

Background
On June 8, 2012, it was announced during a Facebook conferenced by Akemi Shimomura, the president of the International Cultural Association, that the 2012 pageant will be held in Okinawa Prefectural Budokan Arena Building, Naha, Okinawa, Japan on October 21, 2012.

Results

Placements

Special awards

Order of announcements
Top 15

 1. Colombia
 2. Brazil
 3. Japan
 4. Sri Lanka
 5. Finland
 6. Namibia
 7. Venezuela
 8. United Kingdom
 9. USA
 10. Dominican Republic
 11. Philippines
 12. Paraguay
 13. Mexico
 14. India
 15. Haiti

Contestants

Notes

Debuts

Returns

Last competed in 1961:
  (as Burma)
Last competed in 2005:
 

Last competed in 2008:
 
Last competed in 2009:
 
 

Last competed in 2010:

Withdrawals

 
  – Zhang Chengcheng
 
  – Mariam Girmisashvili
 
 
 
 
  – Donique Leonard
  – Winfrida Dominic

Did not compete
  – Melkam Endale

References

External links
 Miss International official website

2012
2012 beauty pageants
Beauty pageants in Japan
2012 in Japan
Okinawa, Okinawa